Reggina Calcio managed to save its Serie A berth at the last minute, for the sixth consecutive season. Nicola Amoruso delivered 12 goals, which was five goals fewer than in the previous season, but enough to land a deal with Torino for the next season.

Squad

Goalkeepers
  Andrea Campagnolo
  Nenad Novaković

Defenders
  Nicolò Cherubin
  Andrea Costa
  Bruno Cirillo
  Salvatore Aronica
  Kris Stadsgaard
  Miguel Garcia
  Carlos Adrián Valdez
  Pablo Álvarez Menéndez
  Francesco Modesto
  Maurizio Lanzaro
  Emmanuel Cascione

Midfielders
  Luca Vigiani
  Édgar Barreto
  Francesco Cozza
  Luca Tognozza
  Emil Hallfreðsson
  Leonardo Pettinari
  Simone Missiroli
  Franco Brienza
  Lóránd Szatmári
  José Montiel

Attackers
  Cristhian Stuani
  Joelson
  Nicola Amoruso
  Stephen Makinwa
  Fabio Ceravolo
  Mike Tullberg

Serie A

Matches
 Reggina-Atalanta 1-1
 1-0 Nicola Amoruso (76)
 1-1 Cristiano Doni (84 pen)
 Torino-Reggina 2-2
 0-1 Nicola Amoruso (31)
 1-1 Alessandro Rosina (45)
 2-1 Nicola Ventola (58)
 2-2 Francesco Cozza (89)
 Reggina-Roma 0-2
 0-1 Juan (51)
 0-2 Francesco Totti (85)
 Udinese-Reggina 2-0
 1-0 Antonio Di Natale (5)
 2-0 Antonio Di Natale (62)
 Juventus-Reggina 4-0
 1-0 Nicola Legrottaglie (48)
 2-0 Hasan Salihamidžić (50)
 3-0 David Trezeguet (75)
 4-0 Raffaele Palladino (90 + 1)
 Reggina-Lazio 1-1
 1-0 Francesco Cozza (8)
 1-1 Aleksandar Kolarov (74)
 Palermo-Reggina 1-1
 0-1 Nicola Amoruso (90 + 2)
 1-1 Amauri (90 + 4)
 Reggina-Inter 0-1
 0-1 Adriano (18)
 Siena-Reggina 0-0
 Reggina-Livorno 1-3
 0-1 Nico Pulzetti (34)
 1-1 Nicola Amoruso (37)
 1-2 Carlos Adrián Valdez (78 og)
 1-3 Fausto Rossini (90)
 Napoli-Reggina 1-1
 0-1 Luca Vigiani (54)
 1-1 Ezequiel Lavezzi (89)
 Reggina-Genoa 2-0
 1-0 Nicola Amoruso (32)
 2-0 Joelson (80)
 Reggina-Fiorentina 0-0
 Sampdoria-Reggina 3-0
 1-0 Claudio Bellucci (4)
 2-0 Paolo Sammarco (55)
 3-0 Claudio Bellucci (76)
 Reggina-Milan 0-1
 0-1 Alberto Gilardino (17)
 Parma-Reggina 3-0
 1-0 Bernardo Corradi (26)
 2-0 Andrea Pisanu (49)
 3-0 Massimo Paci (66)
 Reggina-Catania 3-1
 1-0 Luca Vigiani (34)
 2-0 Luca Vigiani (78)
 2-1 Juan Manuel Vargas (90)
 3-1 Luca Vigiani (90 + 3)
 Empoli-Reggina 1-1
 0-1 Fabio Ceravolo (2)
 1-1 Luca Saudati (5 pen)
 Reggina-Cagliari 2-0
 1-0 Franco Brienza (67)
 2-0 Francesco Cozza (80)
 Atalanta-Reggina 2-2
 1-0 Claudio Rivalta (19)
 2-0 Antonio Langella (46)
 2-1 Luca Vigiani (61)
 2-2 Édgar Barreto (67)
 Reggina-Torino 1-3
 0-1 Alessandro Rosina (23 pen)
 0-2 Roberto Stellone (35)
 1-2 Nicola Amoruso (59)
 1-3 Alessandro Rosina (66 pen)
 Roma-Reggina 2-0
 1-0 Christian Panucci (21)
 2-0 Mancini (76)
 Reggina-Udinese 1-3
 0-1 Simone Pepe (8)
 0-2 Antonio Di Natale (63)
 1-2 Francesco Modesto (76)
 1-3 Antonio Di Natale (90 + 4)
 Reggina-Juventus 2-1
 1-0 Franco Brienza (32)
 1-1 Alessandro Del Piero (72)
 2-1 Nicola Amoruso (90 + 4 pen)
 Lazio-Reggina 1-0
 1-0 Rolando Bianchi (45 pen)
 Reggina-Palermo 0-0
 Inter-Reggina 2-0
 1-0 Zlatan Ibrahimović (14 pen)
 2-0 Nicolás Burdisso (34)
 Reggina-Siena 4-0
 1-0 Franco Brienza (9)
 2-0 Francesco Cozza (19)
 3-0 Franco Brienza (39)
 4-0 Simone Missiroli (68)
 Livorno-Reggina 1-1
 0-1 Franco Brienza (33)
 1-1 Erjon Bogdani (61)
 Reggina-Napoli 1-1
 0-1 Roberto Sosa (76)
 1-1 Franco Brienza (90 + 3)
 Genoa-Reggina 2-0
 1-0 Marco Borriello (59)
 2-0 Marco Rossi (90 + 2)
 Fiorentina-Reggina 2-0
 1-0 Giampaolo Pazzini (23)
 2-0 Adrian Mutu (90 + 2)
 Reggina-Sampdoria 1-0
 1-0 Franco Brienza (35)
 Milan-Reggina 5-1
 1-0 Kaká (8 pen)
 2-0 Kaká (34)
 2-1 Édgar Barreto (40)
 3-1 Kaká (68)
 4-1 Filippo Inzaghi (73)
 5-1 Pato (89)
 Reggina-Parma 2-1
 0-1 Luca Cigarini (25 pen)
 1-1 Francesco Cozza (55)
 2-1 Francesco Cozza (64)
 Catania-Reggina 1-2
 0-1 Nicola Amoruso (41)
 0-2 Nicola Amoruso (90 pen)
 1-2 Jorge Martínez (90 + 2)
 Reggina-Empoli 2-0
 1-0 Édgar Barreto (68)
 2-0 Nicola Amoruso (79)
 Cagliari-Reggina 2-2
 1-0 Joaquín Larrivey (18)
 1-1 Nicola Amoruso (55)
 2-1 Paolo Bianco (81)
 2-2 Nicola Amoruso (86 pen)

Topscorers
  Nicola Amoruso 12
  Franco Brienza 7
  Francesco Cozza 6
  Luca Vigiani 5
  Édgar Barreto 3

Sources
   RSSSF - Italy 2007/08

Reggina 1914 seasons
Reggina